The 1980 Army Cadets football team was an American football team that represented the United States Military Academy in the 1980 NCAA Division I-A football season. In their first season under head coach Ed Cavanaugh, the Cadets compiled a 3–7–1 record and were outscored by their opponents 295 to 204.  In the annual Army–Navy Game, the Cadets lost to Navy, 33 to 6.

Schedule

Personnel

References

External links
 Game program: Army at Washington State – September 27, 1980

Army
Army Black Knights football seasons
Army Cadets football